Steven Molaro (born February 16, 1972) is an American television producer and writer. He has worked on such productions as Freddie, The Class, Complete Savages, Nickelodeon's All That, The Amanda Show, Drake & Josh, Zoey 101 and iCarly and The WB's  What I Like About You.  From 2007 to 2019, he was a producer/writer on the sitcom The Big Bang Theory. Molaro also co-created its prequel spinoff, Young Sheldon, with Chuck Lorre. 

In 2007, he created a troll pizza delivery order, the "None Pizza with Left Beef".

He is a native of Queens, New York.

Molaro has been nominated for Primetime Emmy Award for Outstanding Comedy Series two times along with fellow writers Chuck Lorre and Bill Prady, in 2011 and 2012. He also shared the Danny Thomas Award for Outstanding Producer of Episodic Television, Comedy, with Lorre, Prady and The Big Bang Theory editor Faye Oshima Belyeu, in 2012 and 2013.

Until April 2011, Molaro authored the blog The Sneeze.

Television credits

References

External links
 

American television writers
American male television writers
Living people
People from Queens, New York
Showrunners
Screenwriters from New York (state)
1972 births